The Temagami Occurrence is a geological occurrence in Northeastern Ontario, Canada. It is located near the southern end of Kanichee Lake in west-central Strathy Township. It is named after Temagami, the municipality in which the occurrence is located in.

Gold and silver are the occurrence's primary commodities, while arsenic, zinc and copper are secondary commodities. Felsic metavolcanic rocks and mafic intrusive rocks are cut by silicified zones and veins. Trenches, open pits and stripped areas are present in the Temagami Occurrence from past mining operations.

See also
List of gold mines in Canada
List of mines in Temagami
List of silver mines

References

Mines in Temagami
Strathy Township
Surface mines in Canada
Gold mines in Ontario
Silver mines in Canada
Ore deposits
Geology of Temagami